Duet for Guitars may refer to:
Duet for Guitars #2, the debut studio album by M. Ward, released 1999
"Duet for Guitars #2", the first track on the album
"Duet for Guitars #1", a bonus track on the 2007 reissue of the album
"Duet for Guitars #3," a track on the 2003 album Transfiguration of Vincent by M. Ward